Bahlūl was the common name of Wāhab ibn Amr, a companion of Musa al-Kadhim. He lived in the time of the Caliph Hārūn al-Rashīd. Bahlūl was a well known judge and scholar who came from a wealthy background.

Becoming Bahlūl 
The Caliph Hārūn al-Rashīd had begun a crackdown against the followers of the imprisoned Imam Musa al-Kadhim. Wāhab and a few others met the Imam and sought advice. Mūsá replied with the Arabic letter ﺝ (jīm). Each of these companions took their own interpretation of the letter: jala'u l-waṭan "exile", jabl "refuge in the mountains" and for Wāhab, junūn "madness, possession by the jinn". The next day, Wāhab left his wealthy life, wearing rags and came into the streets. Baghdadis soon dubbed him Bahlūl.

Bahlool was born in Kufa and his real name is Wahab bin Amr. Hārūn al-Rashīd feared for the safety of his Khalifate and Empire from the 7th Imam Musa Al-Kadhim; therefore, he tried to destroy the Imam. Harun thought of a trick by which he could kill the Imam. He put the blame of rebellion upon the Imam and demanded a judicial decree from the pious people of his time—which included Bahlool. Everyone gave the decree except Bahlool, who opposed the decision. He immediately went to the Imam and informed him of the circumstances, and asked for advice and guidance. Then and there the Imam told him to act insanely.

Because of the situation, Bahlool acted insanely as per the Imam's order. By doing this, he was saved from Harun's punishment. Now, without any fear of danger, and in amusing ways, Bahlool protected himself from tyrannies. He insulted the notorious Khalifa and his courtiers just by talking. Nevertheless, people acknowledged his superior wisdom and excellence. Even today many of his stories are narrated in assemblies and teach the listeners valuable lessons.

According to a more popular tradition, some of the Imam's companions and special friends came to him because the Khalifa was angry with them, and asked him for advice. The Imam answered with the sole letter (jim); all of them understood that that was it and asked no further questions.

Each person understood the Holy Imam's advice in his own different way. One person took (jim) to mean (jala'u l-waṭan) --exile. Another thought of (jabal) -- mountain. Bahlool took it to mean (junoon) -- insanity. This is how all of the Imam's companions were saved from calamity.

Before becoming insane, Bahlool lived a life of influence and power, but after obeying the Imam's order, he turned away from the majesty and splendor of the world. In reality, he became crazy. He dressed in rags, preferred desolate places over Haroun's palaces, lived on a bite of stale bread. He did not accept favors from or depend on Haroun or those like him. Bahlool considered himself better than the Khalifa and his courtiers because of his way of life.

(A Poem)

Those with kingly temperaments deserve respect from

the chiefs of the kingdom.

This is a ragged king whose slaves are great and powerful

kings like Jamsheed and Khaqan.

Today he overlooked the goodness of this world, tomorrow

he will not even give importance to Paradise.

Don't look scornfully at these beggars with no shoes on their feet!

They are dearer to wisdom than eyes which shed tears from

fear of Allah.

If Adam sold Paradise for two grains of wheat, then truly know

that these people will not buy it for even one grain.

Bahlool was devoted to Allah; he was an intelligent and virtuous scholar. He was the master of the mind and manners; he spoke with the best of answers ready on his lips; he protected his faith and the Shariah. Bahlool became insane at the Imam's command for the love of Ahl al-Bayt, and so he could enforce the rights of which they had been wronged.

There was no other way for Bahlool to protect his life. For example, Harun told his vizier, Yahya bin Khalid Barmaki, that listening to the words of Imam Jafar al-Sadiq's student Hisham bin Hakam—who proved Musa al-Kadhim's Imamate—was more dangerous to him than 100,000 swords. Harun said, "Even then it amazes me that Hisham is alive and I am in power."

Harun planned to kill Hisham. Hisham learned of this and fled from Kufa, and hid in a friend's house, but after a short while he died.

In popular culture 
Bohlol Dana - A Sage of Baghdad is a 2010 Indian Hindi-language historical film about Bahlool directed by Abdul Qayyoom Khan.

References

External links
Some Interesting Events from the Life of Bohlool
Bahlool the Majnoon
Bahlool Dana
Stories of Bahlool

Year of birth missing
Year of death missing
8th-century people from the Abbasid Caliphate
Scholars from the Abbasid Caliphate
Iraqi Shia Muslims
People from Kufa
8th-century Arabs